The 28th Trampoline and Tumbling World Championships were held in Birmingham, England, from 17 to 20 November 2011 at the National Indoor Arena. This event was the first qualifying round for the 2012 Olympics which was held in London. The top 8 men and women automatically earned their nation quota places for the Olympics, subject to a maximum of two quota places per nation. A further 16 of each sex will get a second chance to earn a quota place at the London test event in January 2012 for a further five spots.

Medal summary

Men's Results

Individual Trampoline
Qualification

Final
The men's individual trampoline final was held on 19 November.

Synchro
The men's synchro final was held on 20 November.

Trampoline Team
The men's trampoline team final was held on 18 November.

Double Mini
The men's double mini final was held on 20 November.

Double Mini Team
The men's double mini team final was held on 19 November.

Tumbling
The men's individual tumbling final was held on 20 November.

Tumbling Team
The men's tumbling team final was held on 18 November.

Women's Results

Individual Trampoline
Qualification

Final
The women's individual trampoline final took place on 20 November.

Synchro
The women's synchro final took place on 19 November.

Trampoline Team
The women's trampoline team final took place on 18 November.

Double Mini
The women's double mini final was held on 20 November.

Double Mini Team
The women's double mini team final was held on 19 November.

Tumbling

Tumbling Team
The women's tumbling team final was held on 19 November.

References

External links
Official website
Official Results
Complete Qualification System London 2012

World Trampoline Championships
Trampoline World Championships
2011 Trampoline World Championships
2011
2011 in British sport
International sports competitions in Birmingham, West Midlands
2010s in Birmingham, West Midlands